Youri Moltchan (also Yury Molchan, born 8 April 8, 1983 in Moldova) is a Russian foil fencer. He won a bronze medal in the team foil event at the 2004 Summer Olympics.

Career highlights

2003
World Junior Championships, Trapani,  3rd
2004
World Cup, Paris,  2nd
Summer Olympics, Athens, 25th
2005
Grand Prix, A Coruña,  2nd
World Cup, Vancouver,  2nd
World Championships, Leipzig, 33rd
2006
World Cup, Seoul,  3rd
World Cup, Bonn,  3rd
World Championships, Turin, 21st
2007
World Championships, St. Petersburg, 55th
2008
World Cup, Copenhagen,  1st

References

External links
  (archive)
 
 
 

1983 births
Living people
Russian male fencers
Fencers at the 2004 Summer Olympics
Olympic fencers of Russia
Olympic bronze medalists for Russia
Olympic medalists in fencing
Medalists at the 2004 Summer Olympics
Universiade medalists in fencing
Universiade bronze medalists for Russia
Medalists at the 2005 Summer Universiade
21st-century Russian people